An Airport Express Train is an airport rail link providing passenger rail transport from an airport to a nearby city.

Airport Express Trains may also refer to:
 Flughafen-Express, to Berlin Brandenburg Airport
 Airport Express (Beijing Subway), connecting Beijing Capital International Airport, China
 Airport Express (MTR), connecting Hong Kong International Airport and Central Hong Kong
 Airport Limited Express, serving Chubu Centrair International Airport from Gifu and Inuyama in Japan

Other Airport "Express" Trains 
 Arlanda Express, Stockholm, Sweden
 City Airport Train, Vienna, Austria
 Delhi Airport Metro Express, connecting Indira Gandhi International Airport, New Delhi with Delhi metro stations
 , a high-speed train between Oslo airport and Oslo, Norway
 Gatwick Express, London, UK
 Heathrow Express, London, UK
 KLIA Express, Kuala Lumpur, MY
 Narita Express, Tokyo, Japan
 Skyliner, Tokyo, Japan
 Stansted Express, London, UK
 Express Line of the Airport Rail Link in Bangkok, Thailand
 , a proposed line connecting São Paulo and São Paulo–Guarulhos International Airport in Brazil

See also 
 Airport Express (disambiguation)